The 2012–13 season was Paris Saint-Germain Football Club's 43rd in existence and their 40th in the top-flight of French football. The team competed in Ligue 1, the Coupe de France, the Coupe de la Ligue and the UEFA Champions League.

Reinforced by new stars Ezequiel Lavezzi, Zlatan Ibrahimović and Thiago Silva, PSG warmed up for the 2012–13 season with the aim of winning the league crown that dramatically eluded the club the previous year. Paris began at home to Lorient at the Parc des Princes. Les Merlus caused Paris plenty of problems and the match ended 2–2 thanks to Ibrahimović's first brace of the season. The PSG squad took a little time to get going and after three consecutive draws, Les Parisiens recorded their first victory in matchweek 4. It was in the north of France that Paris finally launched their campaign against Lille and a 2–1 victory featuring another double from Ibrahimović. Another three points followed against Toulouse (2–0), before it was time for the UEFA Champions League. After nearly a decade's absence, PSG marked their return to Europe's premier club competition with a resounding 4–1 victory over Dynamo Kyiv.

Buoyed by their continental success, the capital club recorded their largest ever away win with a 4–0 demolition of Bastia before defeating Sochaux-Montbéliard 2–0, in a perfect month of September. October began less well with a late 1–0 defeat away to Porto. Then it was time to travel to the Stade Vélodrome for Le Classique against Olympique de Marseille. Inspired, Zlatan netted two more remarkable goals as the match ended 2-2. It got even better as Stade de Reims, Dinamo Zagreb, Nancy and Marseille, this time in the Coupe de la Ligue, all fell to Paris. The first defeat of the campaign came soon after, 2–1, to Saint-Étienne. It marked the start of a difficult month of November for the side from the French capital. A festive December started in style with a 2–1 win over Porto which saw Paris clinch top spot in Group A of the Champions League. Next up came Evian (4-0), Valenciennes (0–4) and Lyon (1–0); all fell victim to the high-flying Les Rouge-et-Bleu. A comprehensive 3-0 win over Stade Brest in the final match of the calendar year saw PSG secure the honorary title of autumn champions.

2013 began with new Brazilian signing Lucas Moura meeting his new teammates. The return to competition wasn't easy with a tough and slender 4–3 win over Arras in the Coupe de France. After a scoreless draw with AC Ajaccio, Paris stepped up a gear with wins over Bordeaux, Toulouse in the Coupe de France and Lille. The run of matches saw goalkeeper Salvatore Sirigu set a new club record for longest run without conceding a goal, surpassing the previous time set by the legendary Bernard Lama. PSG then produced a huge surprise for their supporters by announcing the signature of David Beckham on the final day of the winter transfer window. The arrival of the English superstar saw the club continue on its winning ways with a 4–0 triumph over Toulouse followed by a 3–1 win over Bastia before the last 16 of the Champions League. Away to Spanish giants Valencia in the first leg, Paris run out 2–1 winners.

The return to domestic action proved a little less convincing with a 3–2 upset at the hands of Sochaux. The reaction was immediate. As Beckham debuted in his new colours, Paris recorded back to back 2–0 home wins against arch-rivals Marseille, firstly in the league and then in the Coupe de France. Paris confirmed their place in the Champions League quarter-finals with a 1–1 draw at home to Valencia. Despite hiccups against Reims (0–1) and Saint-Étienne (2–2), Paris continued to set the pace at the top of the ladder with victories over Nancy, 2–1, and defending champions Montpellier, 1–0. Then came one of the highlights of the season with the quarter-final of the Champions League against Barcelona. And the match lived up to the hype with Blaise Matuidi scoring in the last minute to secure a thrilling 2–2 draw at the Parc des Princes. PSG warmed up for the return match against the Catalan outfit with a 2–0 victory over Rennes in Ligue 1. Then, at the Camp Nou, Javier Pastore opened the scoring for Carlo Ancelotti's players, only to be eliminated on away goals by Pedro’s equaliser.

Les Rouges et Bleu bounced back with a 1–0 win over Troyes before quarter-final exits in both the Coupe de la Ligue and the Coupe de France. The players just had to focus on the Ligue 1 title and they did so with a 3–0 victory over Nice before avenging their cup exit with a 1–0 win of their own away to Evian. In the end, a 1–0 win away to Lyon secured the club's first Ligue 1 title in 19 years, and third overall. Jérémy Ménez struck the goal that sent Paris into rapture. The penultimate match of the season saw a 3–1 win over Brest at the Parc des Princes, followed by the official presentation of the Ligue 1 trophy. It also marked the final match of David Beckham's playing career. The final match of the season saw the newly-crowned 2013 champions end with a win over Lorient as Zlatan Ibrahimović received his Golden Boot trophy for Ligue 1 top scorer with 30 goals.

Players

Players, transfers, appearances and goals - 2012/2013 season.

First-team squad

Out on loan

Transfers in

Transfers out

Appearances and goals

Competitions

Ligue 1

League table

Results summary

Results by round

Matches

Coupe de France

Coupe de la Ligue

UEFA Champions League

Group stage

Knockout phase

Round of 16

Quarter-finals

References

External links

PSG.fr – Site officiel
Paris Saint-Germain  at LFP
Paris Saint-Germain at UEFA
Paris Saint-Germain at FIFA

Paris Saint-Germain F.C. seasons
Paris Saint-Germain
Paris Saint-Germain
French football championship-winning seasons